The Cairns A was a low wing, two tandem seat monoplane with a metal structure and stressed metal skin. It first flew late in 1931 with a  engine but was later fitted with more powerful engines including a  radial.

Design and development

The 1930s all metal, stressed skin Cairns A was unusual in a period when many light aircraft had wooden wing structures and most were fabric covered. Cairns had gained experience of metal aircraft structures when building the smaller, somewhat similar Cairns Clark Robinson Special in 1928. The Cairns A's construction details were sufficiently novel to attract the attention of the U.S. Navy Department and delay their release. In particular, the Naval Aircraft Factory Physical Laboratory undertook extensive tests of the monocoque fuselage.

Construction apart, the Cairns A was a conventional cantilever low wing monoplane. The wings, trapezoidal in plan with only slight taper out to blunted tips, carried short ailerons.

The first example flew in April 1930 and was powered by a Cairns G, a licence-built, four cylinder,  Gipsy I air-cooled upright inline engine. Its engine determined its  AG-4 sub-type designation. Cairns Aircraft intended to show that their fuselage could accept higher powers and this first prototype was later fitted with a radial engine of over twice the power of the Gipsy, a six cylinder,  Curtiss Challenger, becoming the AC-6. The AW-5, with a lower-powered, five cylinder,  Wright J-6 radial, was also tested but it is not known if it was a different airframe. Three were expected to be flying in January 1932 but photographic or other evidence is lacking for more than one.

Behind the engine the Model A seated two in separate cockpits, with the passenger or pupil at about one-third chord and the pilot at the trailing edge. The cantilever, trapezoidal tailplane was mounted near mid-fuselage and bore straight-tapered elevators. The largely rounded vertical tail included an unbalanced rudder.

The legs were wing-mounted and enclosed in strongly-tapered, trouser type fairings, with the wheels in spats. There was a tailskid at the rear.

Variants

Cairns AG-4 Four cylinder,  Gipsy I upright inline engine.
Cairns AW-5 Five cylinder,  Wright J-6 radial.
Cairns AC-6 Six cylinder,  Curtiss Challenger radial.

Specifications (Cairns AG-4)

References

Single-engined tractor aircraft
Low-wing aircraft
1930s United States sport aircraft
Aircraft first flown in 1930